Kakai Kilonzo (born 1954 in Kilimambogo, Machakos District - died  on 24 February 1987) was a musician from Kenya. He led the band Kilimambogo Brothers.

Overview
Kilonzo released his first recording with Kilimambogo Brothers in 1975 when he released the song ' Mama Kifagio'. The group split in 1978 when Joseph Mwania and Joseph Sila left to form another group, Original Kilimambogo Stars. Kilonzo, however, continued releasing music with Kilimambogo Brothers. Originally, he performed in Kamba, his native language, but rose into national fame after releasing music in Swahili.

Death
Kilonzo died in 1987 due to illness. After the death of Kakai, his band Les Kilimambogo Brothers continued performing without him, although with less success.

Legacy
The Shava Musik record label has released two Kakai Kilonzo & Kilimambogo Brothers compilation albums: The Best of Kakai Volumes 1 and 2. His song "Mama Sofi pt2" is on the Rough Guide to the Music of Kenya compilation CD.

References
Discography of Kakai Kilonzo & The Kilimanbogo Brothers Band

1954 births
1987 deaths
People from Machakos County
Kenyan musicians